Ryan Swain (born 24 February 1990) is an English television and radio presenter, DJ, motivational speaker, philanthropist, comedian and professional skateboarder. Swain is known for broadcasting on both television and radio, and hosting live events and festivals nationwide.

He won the first ever BBC 'Make a Difference' Award in the together category with BBC Radio York in October 2022. He also won the "York Community Pride - Person Of Year Award" for his outstanding contribution to his local community the award was given to him by The Press (York) at The Principal Hotel. Also in 2022 he was the runner-up of the Inspirational Individual Of The Year and Yorkshire Media Personality of the Year Award in the Yorkshire Choice Awards which was won by ITV's Gaynor Barnes. He was honoured on 2 February 2023 with The Everyone Active Outstanding Achievement Award in the Ryedale District Sports Awards for being a key figure in the rebuilding of Malton & Norton Skate Park as well as been a charity fundraiser who regularly speaks about mental health selflessly. The award was presented to him by Paralympic swimmer Maisie Summers-Newton. He has formerly presented on local radio stations such as YorkMix Radio York's Minster FM which is now Greatest Hits Radio, and Coast & County Radio.

Career 
He started his career as a coat style entertainer at Flamingo Land Resort in North Yorkshire. He was the first and resident host of the theme parks Party In The Park concerts when they first started.

Presenting 
He has hosted for Clubland at the Clubland Weekender at Blackpool Pleasure Beach and Clubland On The Beach event at Redcars Majuba Beach supporting Cascada, Basshunter, Scooter, The Venga Boys, Ben Nicky, DJ Sammy, Sash!, Ultrabeat, N-Trance, Lasgo, Special D. and Micky Modelle.

In 2018 he hosted The Only Fools and Horses Annual Convention which came to Hull for the first time. Swain was on hand to interview the cast of the show.

He hosted and switched on Scarborough's Christmas Lights in November 2019 with Coronation Street star Chris Gascoyne who plays Peter Barlow and Hollyoaks star, turned singer, songwriter Twinnie-Lee Moore.

In February 2020 Swain hosted for multi platinum, west coast rapper The Game at Rainton Arena in Houghton Le Spring. After the show he was invited backstage to meet him.

In March 2020 he went on a UK tour with the newly formed supergroup Boyz On Block consisting of 90's boy band members Abz Love, Dane Bowers, Shane Lynch and Ben Ofoedu hosting for them across Mecca Bingo halls around the country.

Swain occasionally MC's over the sets of live DJ's and groups at events and has MC'd live for N-Trance, Ultrabeat, Andy Whitby, Café Mambo, Ian van Dahl, Rui da Silva (DJ), and Angie Brown.

During the lockdown of the COVID-19 pandemic Swain hosted his own version of the popular TV gameshow Play Your Cards Right online which was initially set up to entertain NHS staff and keyworkers. He would broadcast daily on Instagram live and be joined by a different celebrity guest everyday some of the special guests included Michael Barrymore, Jenny Powell, Natasha Hamilton, Cascada, Antony Costa, Lee Ryan, Marcel Somerville, Jorgie Porter, Tamer Hassan and Keith Duffy on his show.

In 2021 Swain was a regular lunch mate on Steph's Packed Lunch on Channel 4 which is hosted daily by Steph McGovern.

In January 2022 Swain became the official host and face of No Limits Bingo at Majestic Bingo Ltd presenting and touring with the brands Clubingo franchise across the country.

DJ 
Swain is a DJ he is known for mixing and playing high energy sets of club classics and anthems at festivals, live events and nightclubs. He has also DJ'd the Brit Awards after party.

Personal life

He lives in Malton, North Yorkshire. Swain had to have major heart surgery at the age of 4 to save his life, to cure a Patent Ductus Arteriosus which is a condition in which a structure called the ductus arteriosus, normal in fetal life, remains into infancy and onwards, when it should have disappeared.

He did his schooling from Norton Community Primary School and later his secondary education from Norton College. He was expelled from high school at the age of 15 due to his ADHD and behaviour. After school he went on to study musical theatre and drama at Westwood Performing Arts campus at Yorkshire Coast College, now called Scarborough TEC in Scarborough.

In 2020 Swain appeared on an online dating show called Dating In Doors on the popular YouTube Channel Word On The Curb where he met his ex-partner Crystal Barquinha.

He is a vegetarian and has been since 2020. Swain is a father, he has identical twin daughters Ivy-Kay and Isla-Yasmin who were born in April 2015. He is a visual artist. A piece of his artwork titled "Carnivore Of Colours" was entered in to the Ashurst Emerging Art Prize 2021 in London. In March 2021 it was announced he was a finalist in the Uni-ball Posca Artist Of The Year Awards.

Skateboarding
Swain is a skateboarding enthusiast. He is also a commentator, broadcaster and MC for action sports events and demonstrations in skateboarding. In May 2012 he skateboarded a record breaking 54.4 miles in 5 hours raising money and awareness for a charity called Louby's Lifeline which supports Brain Tumour Research. He began skateboarding at the age of 14. He is Regular footed and is known for skating both vert and mini-ramp. His first sponsor was Popcorn skate shop in Northallerton.

Rescue The Ramp Campaign 
In March 2021 Swain started and set up a global campaign in a bid to repair and save the "iconic" half-pipe at his local skate-park. Appealing to the two town councils that co-ran the skate park on Norton Road in Malton to invest in repairing other parts of the local amenity, which is "in a state of disrepair." He also managed to get world famous skateboarders such as Tony Hawk, Bam Margera, Danny Way, Bucky Lasek, Andy Macdonald, Christian Hosoi, and Pro BMX star Jamie Bestwick to support the campaign.

The ramp is one of only nine of its kind in the UK and it is the only one in the north of England which is outdoors and free to use.

In June 2021 Swain and his campaigners led a team of volunteers to the skatepark to carry out works which they had already been given permission to carry out by Norton Town Council by vote at their last meeting. Members of the scheme which was named #RescueTheRamp, successfully stripped back the structure in preparation for a sanding down and repainting refurbishment in the next stage of the project. Swain managed to secure a major sponsorship deal with Habito mortgage brokers for £15,000 which at the time were also the sponsor of Team GB in Skateboarding at the Tokyo 2021 Olympic Games.

The second phase of the scheme, which would see work carried out to resurface the structure, was rejected by the council on 19 July 2021, prompting outrage from campaigners. The town council voted five-four against the project, allowing community activists to rebuild the equipment, citing health and safety concerns, despite Habito offering to pay £15,000 of the cost in return for a sponsorship deal. Councillors concluded the meeting by threatening to call the police on protesters, only to find themselves at the center of an international media storm involving the skateboarding community.

A petition was set up by Swain to help save the regeneration of the Malton, and Norton skatepark, following uncertainty about the plans going ahead. In August 2021 the skatepark was temporarily closed due to concerns about the condition of some of the equipment on the park.

In December 2021 Swain was asked to meet Keane Duncan to discuss supporting a motion which was getting submitted to Ryedale District Council calling for councillors to support Norton Town Council to reopen the skate park and renovate the half pipe. It was due to be discussed at a full council meeting (Thursday, 2 December) but was cancelled hours before the meeting was set to take place due to COVID-19 concerns.

If successful, it would see Ryedale District Council provide a grant of up to £50,000 which is supported by Swain to Norton Town Council, which manages the facility. On 17 February 2022 Ryedale District Council agreed to ring-fence extra funding for projects including:£160,000 to invest in Ryedale's rural communities, £50,000 for the Norton skate park and £150,000 into the community grants scheme for rural community projects. Items on the budget agenda which were not yet voted on will be discussed at the reconvened meeting which is scheduled to be held on 24 February 2022.

On 8 March 2022 after a huge public outcry and a campaign for action set up and spearheaded by Swain, there was good news about the Malton and Norton Skatepark. At an extraordinary meeting of Norton Town Council members voted to appoint a contractor, King Ramps, to repair and resurface the smaller ramps. The long debated repairs to the half-pipe were also discussed at the meeting and a decision made to seek quotes for its repair and resurfacing based on structural survey results recently commissioned by the council. The next decision Norton town council needs to take is to give the go ahead for work to restore the half-pipe which was initially why Swain started the campaign.

On 21 March 2022 work started on site repairing the Malton & Norton skate park in North Yorkshire. Following a successful campaign originally set up and spearheaded by Swain and keen skateboarders in the local area. Swain has been working with the contractor King Ramps on the site rebuilding the park alongside them. Swain wanted to help the local community by repairing and resurfacing the park in the town so it can continue to be used.  Norton and Malton skate park officially reopened to the public on Monday 25 April 2022 – after a safety inspection from RoSPA on the restored site. Campaigners, led by Swain, have worked hard to refurbish the park and now it is ready for use including a couple of new ramps including a small quarter pipe, volcano spine and pyramidal fun box.

The halfpipe and rescue the ramp campaign Swain set up originally is set to be voted on by Norton Town Council in May 2022.

On Monday 16 May 2022 at the first annual meeting for the newly elected members of Norton Town Council there was a motion put in place to vote for the approval of the halfpipe repairs. The vote was approved with 8 members voting in favour and 3 abstentions with Swain and fellow campaigners winning their campaign. Following a 15-month long campaign led by Swain, work on the half-pipe ramp at a recently refurbished skate park is set to go ahead. After relentless campaigning in the Malton area, Norton Town Council have voted and approved the refurbishment of the half-pipe ramp at Malton and Norton skate park.

On Thursday 16 June 2022, the Rescue the Ramp campaigners, led by Swain, attended a Policy and Resources Meeting at Ryedale District Council  to vote and find out if the campaign to restore the half-pipe at Norton and Malton Skate Park was successful. Councillor Keane Duncan and Dinah Keal proposed the funding, which was then seconded by the council during the meeting. The vote was a unanimous yes and was voted through awarding Swain and the campaigners £50,000. After 15 months of relentless campaigning, the halfpipe will be repaired, completing the skatepark which has also undergone a major refurbishment. Swain said: "The halfpipe will be saved, making it the second free to use outdoor half-pipe in the country. "It's going to be a huge tourist attraction and will see skaters and riders from all over the region and beyond use it."

After an 18-month campaign led by Swain the project became successful when Ryedale's Norton-on-Derwent town council voted in favour to approve the refurbishment of the halfpipe on Monday 18 July 2022 and appointed contractor King Ramps to undertake the work.  The battle to save the ramp ran into problems when the council refused to approve a second phase of repair work in 2021 on health and safety grounds. The half-pipe is one of few free-standing ramps of its size in the country that is free to use but has been out of action for around four years despite the rest of the skate park being renovated earlier this year. The fight over its future came to national prominence last year, coinciding with skateboarding making its debut as a sport at the Tokyo Olympics where 13-year-old Team GB skateboarder Sky Brown won a bronze medal.

Swain said "Thank you so much to everyone of you who has supported myself and the campaign team on this journey, perseverance and integrity always prevails."

In August 2022 Swain and King Ramps started repair work on the iconic halfpipe.

On Monday 26 September 2022 the ramp at Norton skatepark was given the official go ahead by the Royal Society for the Prevention of Accidents (RoSPA). work at Norton has included resurfacing and restoring the halfpipe and existing skatepark with ‘Skatelite’ – a durable paper-composite material used at top skateparks all over the globe. Swain and the team have installed their own ‘blue plaque’ to commemorate the importance of the ramp making it a community asset.

100 Mile Challenge 
In 2022 Swain Skateboarded a gruelling 100 miles throughout May in support of Cancer Research UK, in a bid to raise money and awareness for the 'Wheel 100' appeal.

He kicked and pushed his way all over the county of North Yorkshire to rack up the miles in exchange for sponsors and donations, all of which will be donated to supporting the work of Cancer Research UK. He completed his challenge in 12 hours and 27 minutes over a period of 3 days on Sunday 15 May 2022 raising £891 the charity.

2023 World Record Attempt In Skateboarding
On 14 December 2022 Swain announced he was aiming to smash and set a new world record officially in 2023 for the Guinness World Records in Skateboarding in the hope of travelling 300 miles or more in less than 24 hours - whilst raising money and awareness for his chosen charity, Mind (charity). Swain's goal is the equivalent of 13 full marathons in a day which will take place on Monday 8 May 2023 for the charity - and he will be using the Elvington Airfield in York for the task. He will be the first GB Skateboarder to hold the record if completed.

The longest distance travelled on a skateboard in 24 hours and current world record is 261.8 miles, completed by Andrew Andras in Homestead, Florida, USA, which was recorded to be almost 10 marathons in one day. Joe Mazzone, a 27-year-old from Littleton, Colorado, unofficially achieved 313.9 miles at the Miami 24 hour Ultraskate. Less than 10 riders have ever hit 300 miles.

Swain is now training three times a week at Everyone Active's Derwent swim and fitness center in Norton where he has been given a year's free pass to train ahead of his challenge in May 2023. Whilst training hard he has enforced dietary changes in preparation for the challenge. He will be representing Skateboard GB during the challenge.

ADHD and mental health 
Swain is also a mental health campaigner, advocate and fundraiser. He has Attention deficit hyperactivity disorder (ADHD) and has campaigned for more awareness of the condition.  when he was 21 he was diagnosed with the disorder. Since his diagnosis he has focused on raising both money and awareness and creating content around mental health and wellbeing, the Law of attraction (New Thought) and ADHD which have been viewed millions of times across social media and help people on a daily basis.

In March 2017 he was a special guest on The Chrissy B Show to speak about ADHD and how he had channelled it into his career as a comedian and entertainer.

ADHD & Me Campaign 
During ADHD Awareness Month in October 2021 he announced that he was planning a countrywide motivational speaking tour to raise awareness of ADHD. The tour, called 'ADHD & Me', which is a motivational and educational talk and touring show aimed at all age groups but mainly young people, which is encouraging people to speak out about their mental health disorders. He has been giving motivational talks selflessly in schools, colleges, universities, community groups and theatres across the country. He has also been delivering them virtually to sold-out audiences across the world – and is continuing to do so into 2022.

Swain's brother Trent is Autistic a neurodevelopmental disorder which he sometimes sees behavioural traits within himself.

Charity work 
In December 2019 he raised more than £1,750 for the York charity SASH and Simon On The Streets in Leeds by re-enacting a rough sleep. He also sold personal artwork, spending 24 hours on the streets without life's luxuries, authentically portraying what sleeping rough is like.

During the COVID-19 pandemic he live streamed his performances and DJ sets across charity pages and groups on Facebook, helping to raise over £25,000 for various NHS Charities.

Swain was once a youth worker. He has taken part in various fundraising events for the charity Louby's Lifeline which is a charity supporting Brain Tumour Research and Children with Cancer. He has also organised and taken part in The Fully Monty and skateboarded from Malton to Scarborough for charity.

In July 2007 Swain was one of ten youths worldwide crowned a Huggable Hero with Build-A-Bear Workshop. They received more than 1,300 nominations for the fourth annual search for Huggable Heroes, a program that rewards kids for their outstanding acts of generosity and volunteerism and encourages other kids to do the same. He won his title and prize for his philanthropy from a young age.

Swain was nominated for the Inspirational Individual Of The Year award in the Yorkshire Choice Awards 2022 in recognition of his charity work in his local community, the NHS and for mental health awareness he has raised. He was shortlisted and came in the final 3.

In May 2022 he took it upon himself to Skateboard 100 miles for Cancer Research UK to raise money and awareness for their wheel 100 appeal.

In July 2022 Swain was successful and was awarded £50,000 from Ryedale District Council to fix and refurbish the iconic halfpipe and skatepark in Norton & Malton which he fought and campaigned selflessly for 18 months to save.

In 2023 Swain announced he was to attempt a Guinness World Records in Skateboarding to raise money and awareness for Mind (charity)

Awards
 Huggable Hero Award – Build A Bear Workshop  – Winner (2007)
Phoenix Newspaper Award for People's Choice – Winner (2018 and 2020)
 Yorkshire Gig Guide Grassroots Award for Outstanding Individual Contribution – Winner (2018)
 National Choice Award -Winner (2019)
 NEA People's Choice Award – Winner (2020)
 Yorkshire Media Personality Of The Year – Nomination (2018)
Posca Artist Of The Year – Finalist (2021)
NEA National Choice Award – Finalist (2021)
Yorkshire Choice Awards - Inspirational Individual Of The Year – Finalist (2022)
Yorkshire Blogger Awards - Influential Blogger Of The Year - Nomination / Finalist (2022)
York Press Community Pride Award - Person Of The Year - Winner (2022) 
BBC Make A Difference Award - Together Award - Winner (2022)
Yorkmix Hero Awards - Nomination (2022) 
Everyone Active - Outstanding Achievement Award (2023) 
NEA Special Recognition Award – Winner (2023)

References

External links

 

Living people
English television presenters
English radio presenters
People from Malton, North Yorkshire
1990 births
Motivational speakers
British motivational speakers
English skateboarders
English DJs